Lantzville is a coastal community on the east side of Vancouver Island, British Columbia, Canada, along the western shore of the Strait of Georgia and immediately north of Nanaimo.

The District of Lantzville was incorporated on June 25, 2003. The district is almost completely residential, with some commercial buildings on Lantzville Road (formerly part of the Island Highway).

The area is served by the coast-spanning Island Highway and the Island Rail Corridor.

History
Lantzville was originally a mining town and is named after its American founder, Fraser Harry Lantz who invested in a coal mine in Nanoose.

In honour of its history as a coal mining area, Lantzville annually celebrates Minetown Day, which is a community fair. According to Lantzville: The First Hundred Years, the first European settler in the area was an English Coal Miner named Emanuel Wiles, also known as Robert Emanuel or Bob. Lantzville is a tourist destination with a number of well located bed and breakfast operations.

Demographics 

Religion 
According to the 2021 census, religious groups in Lantzville included:
Irreligion (2,440 persons or 63.9%)
Christianity (1,285 persons or 33.6%)
Buddhism (15 persons or 0.4%)
Other (55 persons or 1.4%)

Education 
Lantzville is home to Seaview Elementary School which is K - 7 and part of the Nanaimo-Ladysmith School District #68. There is also a local private school called Aspengrove School, which is JK - 12.

Grades 8 - 12 are schooled in Nanaimo at Dover Bay Secondary School.

Notable residents
John Wilson
Dylan Ferguson
Callum Montgomery

References

External links 

District municipalities in British Columbia
Populated places in the Regional District of Nanaimo
Designated places in British Columbia